Tangnan may refer to these towns in China:

Tangnan, Anhui (塘南), in Dangtu County, Anhui
Tangnan, Guangdong (汤南), in Fengshun County, Guangdong
Tangnan, Jiangxi (塘南), in Nanchang, Jiangxi